Fluid Rustle is an album by German double bassist and composer Eberhard Weber recorded in 1979 and released on the ECM label. This was Bill Frisell's first appearance on an ECM recording.

Reception 
The Allmusic review awarded the album 4½ stars.

Track listing
All compositions by Eberhard Weber.

 "Quiet Departures" – 17:29 
 "Fluid Rustle" – 7:28 
 "A Pale Smile" – 9:13 
 "Visible Thoughts" – 4:59

Personnel
Eberhard Weber – bass, percussion
Bill Frisell – guitar, balalaika
Gary Burton – vibraphone, marimba
Bonnie Herman, Norma Winstone – vocals

References

ECM Records albums
Eberhard Weber albums
1979 albums
Albums produced by Manfred Eicher